The Dreg I class was a ship class of four hydrographic survey vessels that were built in the Netherlands for the Royal Netherlands Navy (RNN). They served in the RNN between 1950 and 1986.

Design and construction
The hydrographic survey vessels of the Dreg I class were all built at the shipyard of De Groot & Van Vliet in Slikkerveer.

For surveying the vessels were equipped with echo sounders and marker buoys that were shaped as spheres.

Service history
In November 1950 two vessels of the Dreg I class were transported from the Netherlands to Dutch New Guinea by ship. In total three survey vessels of the Dreg I class (Dreg I, Dreg II and Dreg III) served in Dutch New Guinea till 1 October 1962.

In 1963 the Dreg I-class hydrographic survey vessels were active in the North Sea to collect data that would help determine the safest waterway to the Europoort.

In 1966 three Dreg I-class survey vessels were used to map a part of the IJsselmeer between Staveren and Lemmer.

In 1970 three hydrographic survey vessels of the Dreg I class were sold.

Ships in class

Notes

Citations

References

Survey vessels of the Royal Netherlands Navy